Richard Frederick "Digger" Phelps (born July 4, 1941) is an American former college basketball coach, most notably of the Notre Dame Fighting Irish from 1971 to 1991. For 20 years, from 1993 to 2014, he served as an analyst on ESPN. He got the nickname "Digger" from his father, who was a mortician in Beacon, New York.

Early life
Phelps was born in Beacon, New York. His family ran a funeral home business in the city.

Coaching career

Early career
Phelps began his coaching career in 1963 as a graduate assistant at Rider College (now Rider University), where he had played basketball. After a move to St. Gabriel's High School in Hazleton, Pennsylvania, he obtained his first full assistant job in 1966 at the University of Pennsylvania in Philadelphia.

His first head coaching job came in 1970 at Fordham University in The Bronx, where he coached Charlie Yelverton and P. J. Carlesimo, the athletic director's son. Phelps led the Rams to a 24–2 record in the 1970–71 regular season and a #9 national ranking.

Fordham received an at-large bid to the 25-team NCAA tournament, where they advanced to the Sweet Sixteen, and won the consolation game for third place in the East regional.

In May 1971 at age 29, Phelps was named head coach at the University of Notre Dame.

Notre Dame
During his 20 seasons (1971–91) tenure, Phelps' Notre Dame teams went , with 14 seasons of 20 wins or more. In 1978, Notre Dame made its only Final Four appearance to date. His most-remembered game occurred in 1974, when the second-ranked Fighting Irish scored the last 12 points of the game on January 19 to upset top-ranked UCLA, coached by John Wooden, 71–70, ending the Bruins' record 88-game winning streak. He shares the NCAA record for most upsets over a #1 team at seven with Gary Williams.

Broadcasting career
Phelps began his broadcasting career when he served as a commentator for ABC Sports' basketball coverage at the 1984 Summer Olympics in Los Angeles. In 1992, he continued his broadcasting career when he provided color commentary for that year's NCAA tournament for CBS. He joined ESPN the next season and worked for them until 2014 as a college basketball studio and game analyst.

During the April 7, 2014 broadcast of "College GameDay", Phelps announced that he was leaving ESPN. "I spent 20 years at Notre Dame as a coach and now 20 years here at ESPN doing a great job with all you people. And now it's time for me to move forward, and this will be my last time on TV," Phelps said. Phelps added: "It's been a great run. Twenty years is always my target for everything, and it's time to move forward."

Off the court
After retiring from Notre Dame, Phelps briefly worked for the Office of National Drug Control Policy in the administration of George H. W. Bush and also served as an observer in the 1993 elections in Cambodia. In 1995, he made what was considered then to be a farcical announcement that he was running for president.

Phelps is a great fan of opera. The well-rounded former coach made a cameo appearance in the Notre Dame student opera performance of Offenbach's "Orpheus in the Underworld". Phelps played the part of Bacchus, the God of Wine, in two performances in April 2006.

A lifelong Chicago Cubs fan, Phelps has thrown out numerous ceremonial first pitches at Wrigley Field and has sung during the 7th inning stretch for 20 consecutive years as of August 2017.

Phelps released his memoirs in 2007, titled "Undertaker's Son: Life Lessons from a Coach." Phelps co-wrote the book with Jack Colwell, and the book details Phelps' upbringing, professional success and life principles. In 2017, Phelps wrote the book "Father Ted Hesburgh: He Coached Me," co-written with Tim Bourret. The book chronicles the life of Father Theodore Hesburgh, who served as Notre Dame's president from 1952 until his retirement in 1987 and was a key figure in the civil rights movement.

Personal life
Phelps resides in South Bend and has three adult children. His eldest, Karen, was married to baseball pitcher Jamie Moyer. He is a member of the Tau Kappa Epsilon fraternity at Rider College.

Phelps was instrumental in the restoration of various programs at John McDonogh High School in New Orleans post-Hurricane Katrina. His gifts helped to restore the sports program and helped to launch a four-year Culinary Academy in partnership with the Louisiana Restaurant Association Education Foundation and the Recovery School District on December 15, 2010.

Cancer battle
In April 2013, Phelps was diagnosed with bladder cancer. On July 1, 2013, his doctor declared him in remission.

Honors
Digger Phelps Court is a street in Beacon, New York.

Head coaching record

See also
 List of NCAA Division I Men's Final Four appearances by coach

References

External links
 
 ESPN profile

1941 births
Living people
American men's basketball coaches
American men's basketball players
Basketball coaches from New York (state)
Basketball players from New York (state)
College basketball announcers in the United States
College men's basketball head coaches in the United States
Fordham Rams men's basketball coaches
Notre Dame Fighting Irish men's basketball coaches
Penn Quakers men's basketball coaches
People from Beacon, New York
Rider Broncs men's basketball players